James Redwick "Red" Weaver (July 19, 1897 – November 23, 1968) was an American football player and coach.

Centre College
Weaver was a prominent center for the Centre Praying Colonels football teams of Centre College in Danville, Kentucky. After graduating from North Side High School in Fort Worth, Texas, coached by former Centre player Robert L. Myers, Weaver and several teammates were to go to Centre. However, Weaver, along with Bo McMillin, did not have sufficient credits to enter college, and thus entered Somerset High School in Somerset, Kentucky for the 1916–17 year. Red Roberts was already a member of the Somerset squad. The three formed a powerful nucleus which went undefeated. He kicked 37 consecutive field goals from 1917 to 1918.  Weaver was the center on Centre's all-time football team chosen in 1935; picked over Ed Kubale.

1919
Weaver was recognized as a consensus first-team All-American in 1919, while playing center for the Centre Colonels football team of Centre College.  Weaver was the smallest lineman ever to make All-American. He was 5 feet 10 inches and 185 pounds.

1920
Weaver held the NCAA record for 99 consecutive points after touchdowns in the 1919 and 1920 seasons.  Weaver was put at the placekicker position on an Associated Press Southeast Area All-Time football team 1869-1919 era.

Coaching
Weaver was the head football coach at West Virginia University Institute of Technology in Montgomery, West Virginia.  He held that position for the 1921 season.  His coaching record at West Virginia Tech was 4–3–1. He also coached the Columbus Tigers in 1924 and 1925.

Pro football
Weaver later played center professionally for the Columbus Tigers of the National Football League (NFL) in 1923

References

External links

1897 births
1968 deaths
American football centers
American football placekickers
Centre Colonels football players
Charleston Golden Eagles football coaches
Columbus Panhandles coaches
West Virginia Tech Golden Bears football coaches
All-American college football players
All-Southern college football players
People from Garland, Texas